The Oxford Illustrated Press Ltd was a book publishing company associated with Oxford, England.  The company was based in Shelley Close, Headington, east Oxford.

Selected books
Books published by the Oxford Illustrated Press include:

 Curl, James Stevens, The Erosion of Oxford, 1977. .
 Dodwell, Christina, In Papua New Guinea. .
 Graham, Malcolm, Henry Taunt of Oxford: A Victorian Photographer, 1973. .
 McNeish, Cameron, Backpacker’s Manual, 1984. .
 Perrin, Jim, Yes, To Dance, 1990.
 Redhead, Brian, The National Parks of England Wales, 1988.
 Rose, Andrea, Pre-Raphaelite Portraits. .

References

Companies with year of establishment missing
Companies based in Oxford
Book publishing companies of England
Private companies limited by guarantee of England